Aathanad is a mountain situated in Vallanghy, Nemmara, Palakkad district, Kerala.
It is famous for the Ayyappa Temple in the top of the mountain. The annual festival held here on Malayalam month Dhanu 9 or (24 December). People from different places will come here to hire this mountain to get blessed. Nellikulangara Temple is situated in the valley of this Aathanad, where the famous Vallanghy-Nenmara Vela is celebrating every year.
From the top of the Aathanadu mountain we will get a great view of the Vallanghy, Nemmara towns, Pothundi Dam, Nelliyampathy hills and the green carpet of paddy fields which makes Palakkad the Granary of Kerala. The mountain hiring gives a good experience.

Mountains of Kerala
Geography of Palakkad district